Sergio Fantoni (7 August 1930 – 17 April 2020) was an Italian actor, voice actor and director.

Biography
Fantoni was born in Rome to the actor Cesare Fantoni. He began his career appearing in films, radio dramas, television and theatrical productions from the late 1940s. He made his debut film appearance alongside his father in the 1949 film Anthony of Padua.

In addition to working mainly in his own country, he starred in international productions as well. Fantoni made several appearances in Hollywood films in the 1960s, most notably opposite Frank Sinatra in the war film Von Ryan's Express, made in 1965. In 1960, he played the villainous Haman in Esther and the King, starring Joan Collins and Richard Egan in the title roles.  Among his roles in the UK, Fantoni appeared alongside Anglo-Italian actress Cherie Lunghi in the Channel 4 television series The Manageress.

Fantoni was also a voice actor. He most notably dubbed over Marlon Brando’s voice in Apocalypse Now.  He also provided voice-overs for Henry Fonda, Rock Hudson, Gregory Peck, Ben Kingsley, Max von Sydow and Robert Taylor in at least one or two of their movies.

Personal life
Fantoni was married to actress Valentina Fortunato (whom he met at the Piccolo Teatro in Milan in 1954) from 1961 until her death in 2019. They had one daughter, Monica.

In 1997, Fantoni underwent a laryngectomy, which caused problems for his voice. Because of this, he devoted himself mainly to directing until his retirement in 2003.

Fantoni died on 17 April 2020, at the age of 89.

Selected filmography

 Anthony of Padua (1949) – Un cavaliere
 Paolo e Francesca (1950)
 The Lion of Amalfi (1950) – Ruggero
 Le meravigliose avventure di Guerrin Meschino (1952)
 Captain Phantom (1953) – Officer in second
 Senso (1954) – Luca
 The Prince with the Red Mask (1955)
 Io sono la primula rossa (1955) – Lord Sheridan
 Nella città l'inferno (1959) – Giudice instruttore (uncredited)
 Hercules Unchained (1959) – Eteocles
 Caterina Sforza, la leonessa di Romagna (1959) – Giacomo Feo
 La notte del grande assalto (1959) – Marco da Volterra
 The Giant of Marathon (1959) – Teocrito
 The Employee (1960) – Sergio
 Escape by Night (1960) – Don Valerio
 Atom Age Vampire (1960) – Pierre Mornet
 I Delfini (1960) – Doctor Mario Corsi
 Esther and the King (1960) – Haman
 Il peccato degli anni verdi (1960) – Giulia's husband
 Il sicario (1961)
 Gioventù di notte (1961) – Commissario
 Man nennt es Amore (1961) – Fabrizio
 Pigeon Shoot (1961) – Nardi
 Morte di un bandito (1961) – Michele Galardo
 The Shortest Day (1962) – (uncredited)
 Ten Italians for One German (1962) – Gilberto di San Severino
 Catherine of Russia (1963) – Orloff
 Kali Yug: Goddess of Vengeance (1963) – Ram Chand
 Il mistero del tempio indiano (1963) – Ram Chand
 The Prize (1963) – Dr. Carlo Farelli
 High Infidelity (1964) – Luigi (segment "La Sospinosa")
 Corpse for the Lady (1964) – Commisario
 Von Ryan's Express (1965) – Capt. Oriani
 Do Not Disturb (1965) – Paul
 What Did You Do in the War, Daddy? (1966) – Capt. Fausto Oppo
 Diabolically Yours (1967) – Freddie
 Hornets' Nest (1970) – Capt. Friedrich Von Hecht
 Sacco e Vanzetti (1971) – Consul Giuseppe Andrower (uncredited)
 Bad Man's River (1971) – Colonel Enrique Fierro
 The Bloody Hands of the Law (1973) – Musante
 Una chica y un señor (1974) – El Señor
 Le Hasard et la Violence (1974) – Inspecteur Tanner
 E cominciò il viaggio nella vertigine (1974) – Andrei
 L'inconveniente (1976)
 Si elle dit oui... je ne dis pas non (1983) – Carniato
 The Belly of an Architect (1987) – Io Speckler
 Private Affairs (1988)
 Per non dimenticare (1992)
 The Accidental Detective (2003) – Baroni (final film role)

Dubbing roles

Live action
 Walter E. Kurtz in Apocalypse Now
 Jordan "Bick" Benedict Jr. in Giant
 U.S. President in Meteor
 Mahatma Gandhi in Gandhi
 Dr. Danielsson in Hurricane
 Charles Keith in Marooned
 Sheriff Henry Tawes in I Walk the Line
 Jake Wade in The Law and Jake Wade
 John Nordley in The House of the Seven Hawks
 Thomas Farrell in Party Girl
 Alwin Kramer in Tora! Tora! Tora!
 Max Bercovicz in Once Upon a Time in America
 James A. Garfield in The Price of Power
 Prince Paul Chegodieff in Rasputin and the Empress
 Caldicott in The Lady Vanishes
 Prince Paul von Haraldberg in Anastasia
 Prince Escalus of Verona in Romeo and Juliet
 Sir in The Dresser
 André Delambre in The Fly
 Dr. John Constable in St. Ives
 Robert Hearn in The Naked and the Dead
 Edoardo in Il bell'Antonio
 Peter Van Hoek in The Badlanders
 Rodrigo Sanchez in The Naked Maja
 Guy Haines in Strangers on a Train
 Galeazzo Ciano in The Verona Trial
 Mr. Miggs in Bonnie Scotland (1957 redub)
 Lope de Aguirre in Aguirre, the Wrath of God
 Lee in The Magnificent Seven
 Karl Stegner in Firepower

References

External links

Official Website

1930 births
2020 deaths
Male actors from Rome
Italian male film actors
Italian male stage actors
Italian male television actors
Italian male voice actors
Italian male radio actors
Italian theatre directors
20th-century Italian male actors
20th-century Italian dramatists and playwrights